The Grote 1-MeiPrijs (also named Ereprijs Victor De Bruyne) was a European single-day cycle race held in the Belgian region of Flanders, around Hoboken. From 2005, the race was organized as a 1.2 event on the UCI Europe Tour. The race was downgraded to a national event in 2014 and not held after 2015.

Winners

External links

Cycle races in Belgium
UCI Europe Tour races
Recurring sporting events established in 1928
1928 establishments in Belgium
Sport in Antwerp
2015 disestablishments in Belgium
Recurring sporting events disestablished in 2015
Defunct cycling races in Belgium